Howells is a Welsh surname. Notable people with the surname include:

Adele C. Howells (1886–1951), fourth general president of the Primary (children's organization) of the Church of Jesus Christ of Latter-day Saints (LDS Church)
Anne Howells (1941–2022), British operatic mezzo-soprano
Callum Scott Howells (born 1999), Welsh actor
Danny Howells (born 1970), English record producer and disc jockey
David Howells (born 1967), English footballer
Glenn Howells, British-born architect
Herbert Howells (1892–1983), English composer
John Mead Howells (1868–1959), American architect
Kim Howells (born 1946), Welsh Labour politician and member of Parliament
Roger Howells, Welsh footballer
Rosalind Howells (born 1931), English Labour politician and member of House of Lords
Sarah Howells, British singer-songwriter and trance vocalist
Tyler Howells (born 1983), American ice hockey player
Ursula Howells (1922–2005), English actress
William Dean Howells (1837–1920), American realist author and literary critic
William W. Howells (1908–2005), professor of anthropology at Harvard
Sean Howells (born 1970), Artist